"Dammit Man" is a song by American rapper Pitbull featuring Piccalo. It was released on August 3, 2004 as a single from Pitbull's debut album M.I.A.M.I..The song was produced by Jim Jonsin. It peaked at number 19 on the US Bubbling Under Hot 100 Singles chart.

Music video
This video was directed by Flyy Kai. It features both Pitbull and Piccallo. The video also features a cameo from DJ Khaled.

Track listing
"Dammit Man" (Album Version) (featuring Piccallo) – 4:01
"Dammit Man" (Remix) (featuring Lil' Flip) – 3:46
Source:

Charts

Release history

References

2004 songs
2005 singles
Pitbull (rapper) songs
TVT Records singles
Song recordings produced by Jim Jonsin
Songs written by Pitbull (rapper)
Songs written by Jim Jonsin
Songs written by Frank Romano